The 2012 WNBA season is the 16th season for the Los Angeles Sparks of the Women's National Basketball Association.

Transactions

WNBA Draft
The following are the Sparks' selections in the 2012 WNBA Draft.

Transaction log
February 1, 2011: The Sparks acquired a second-round pick from the Tulsa Shock as part of the Andrea Riley trade.
April 11, 2011: The Sparks acquired a second-round pick from the Chicago Sky as part of the Lindsay Widsom-Hylton trade.
February 1: The Sparks traded Noelle Quinn to the Washington Mystics in exchange for Marissa Coleman.
February 8: The Sparks signed Alana Beard.
February 23: The Sparks traded Natasha Lacy and LaToya Pringle to the Washington Mystics in exchange for Nicky Anosike.
February 23: The Sparks signed Sharnee Zoll.
March 9: The Sparks signed Ashley Shields.
April 9: The Sparks signed Darxia Morris.
April 23: The Sparks signed draft picks Khadijah Rushdan and April Sykes.
April 24: The Sparks signed Rashidat Junaid.
April 25: The Sparks re-signed Candace Parker to a multi-year contract.
April 26: The Sparks signed draft picks Nneka Ogwumike and Tyra White.
May 8: The Sparks waived Tyra White and Rashidat Junaid.
May 15: The Sparks waived Khadijah Rushdan, Ashley Shields, and Darxia Morris.
June 8: The Sparks signed Coco Miller and waived Sharnee Zoll.
July 2: The Sparks waived Coco Miller.
July 5: The Sparks signed Andrea Riley.

Trades

Personnel changes

Additions

Subtractions

Roster

Season standings

Schedule

Preseason

|- align="center" bgcolor="bbffbb"
| 1 || Sat 5 || 7:00 || China ||  || 98-71 || Ogwumike (20) || Ogwumike (11) || 4 players (5) || Pasadena City College  1,073 || 1-0
|- align="center" bgcolor="bbffbb"
| 2 || Thu 10 || 10:30 || Japan ||  || 95-77 || Ogwumike (17) || LavenderOgwumike (6) || Zoll (6) || LA Southwest College  950 || 2-0
|- align="center" bgcolor="ffbbbb"
| 3 || Sun 13 || 5:00 || @ Seattle ||  || 60-61 || Coleman (11) || Ogwumike (7) || Zoll (8) || KeyArena  4,628 || 2-1
|-

Regular season

|- align="center" bgcolor="bbffbb"
| 1 || Fri 18 || 10:00 || @ Seattle || NBATVKDOC || 72-66 || Toliver (25) || Milton-Jones (7) || Toliver (6) || KeyArena  9,686 || 1-0
|- align="center" bgcolor="bbffbb"
| 2 || Tue 22 || 10:30 || Seattle || KDOCKONG || 74-61 || Parker (21) || Parker (10) || ParkerToliver (4) || Staples Center  9,238 || 2-0
|- align="center" bgcolor="ffbbbb"
| 3 || Thu 24 || 8:00 || @ Minnesota ||  || 84-92 || ParkerToliver (23) || Ogwumike (9) || Toliver (4) || Target Center  7,923 || 2-1
|- align="center" bgcolor="bbffbb"
| 4 || Sat 26 || 10:00 || @ Phoenix || KDOC || 99-88 || Parker (27) || Parker (11) || BeardToliver (4) || US Airways Center  10,200 || 3-1
|- align="center" bgcolor="bbffbb"
| 5 || Tue 29 || 10:30 || Tulsa || TWC101 || 76-75 || Milton-JonesToliver (16) || Parker (10) || Toliver (5) || Staples Center  8,312 || 4-1
|-

|- align="center" bgcolor="bbffbb"
| 6 || Sun 3 || 8:30 || Seattle || KDOCKONG || 67-65 || Toliver (23) || Parker (13) || Toliver (7) || Staples Center  12,639 || 5-1
|- align="center" bgcolor="bbffbb"
| 7 || Fri 8 || 11:00 || Phoenix || TWC101 || 90-74 || Ogwumike (25) || Ogwumike (12) || Toliver (9) || Staples Center  11,198 || 6-1
|- align="center" bgcolor="bbffbb"
| 8 || Wed 13 || 8:00 || @ Connecticut || ESPN2 || 87-81 || Parker (33) || Parker (16) || Parker (8) || Mohegan Sun Arena  6,058 || 7-1
|- align="center" bgcolor="ffbbbb"
| 9 || Fri 15 || 7:30 || @ Atlanta || SSO || 59-92  || Ogwumike (13) || Ogwumike (10) || Coleman (4) || Philips Arena  8,872 || 7-2
|- align="center" bgcolor="ffbbbb"
| 10 || Sat 16 || 8:00 || @ San Antonio || KDOCFS-SW || 85-98 (OT)  || Beard (23) || ParkerLavender (11) || Toliver (5) || AT&T Center  8,234 || 7-3
|- align="center" bgcolor="bbffbb"
| 11 || Mon 18 || 10:30 || Washington || TWC101 || 101-70 || Ogwumike (24) || Parker (8) || Toliver (6) || Staples Center  8,612 || 8-3
|- align="center" bgcolor="bbffbb"
| 12 || Wed 20 || 10:30 || Tulsa || TWC101 || 95-79 || Parker (33) || Parker (8) || Toliver (6) || Staples Center  8,388 || 9-3
|- align="center" bgcolor="bbffbb"
| 13 || Sat 23 || 8:00 || @ Phoenix || ESPN || 93-84 || Toliver (29) || Lavender (9) || Toliver (4) || US Airways Center  9,670 || 10-3
|- align="center" bgcolor="ffbbbb"
| 14 || Sun 24 || 8:30 || San Antonio || KDOC || 71-91 || Parker (15) || Parker (15) || Beard (4) || Staples Center  11,301  || 10-4 
|- align="center" bgcolor="ffbbb"
| 15 || Tue 26 || 8:00 || @ Tulsa || || 75-91 || Toliver (21) || OgwumikeLavender (7) || Toliver (7) || BOK Center  4,102 || 10-5
|- align="center" bgcolor="ffbbbb"
| 16 || Thu 28 || 12:30 || @ San Antonio || FS-SW || 80-94 || Parker (25) || Parker (13) || Beard (10) || AT&T Center  15,184 || 10-6
|-

|- align="center" bgcolor="bbffbb"
| 17 || Thu 5 || 3:00 || Minnesota || NBATVTWC101 || 96-90 || Toliver (29) || Parker (13) || Toliver (6) || Staples Center  11,256 || 11-6
|- align="center" bgcolor="bbffbb"
| 18 || Sat 7 || 10:00 || Seattle || ESPN2 || 83-59 || Toliver (23) || Parker (14) || Parker (7) || Staples Center  12,229 || 12-6
|- align="center" bgcolor="bbffbb"
| 19 || Sun 8 || 8:30 || Atlanta || NBATVKDOC || 79-63 || Toliver (19) || Parker (12) || Beard (7) || Staples Center  11,019 || 13-6
|- align="center" bgcolor="bbffbb"
| 20 || Tue 10 || 3:30 || @ Phoenix ||  || 90-71 || Parker (22) || OgwumikeParker (14) || Beard (7) || US Airways Center  9,336 || 14-6
|- align="center" bgcolor="bbffbb"
| 21 || Thu 12 || 7:00 || @ Indiana || ESPN2 || 77-74 || Ogwumike (22) || Ogwumike (20) || Toliver (4) || Bankers Life Fieldhouse  7,244 || 15-6
|-
| colspan="11" align="center" valign="middle" | Summer Olympic break
|-

|-
| colspan="11" align="center" valign="middle" | Summer Olympic break
|- align="center" bgcolor="bbffbb"
| 22 || Sat 18 || 10:00 || @ Seattle || NBATVKDOC || 82-71 || Toliver (22) || Parker (12) || Toliver (5) || KeyArena  9,127 || 16-6
|- align="center" bgcolor="bbffbb"
| 23 || Tue 21 || 10:30 || Indiana || TWC101 || 79-69 || Toliver (21) || Ogwumike (10) || BeardMilton-Jones (5) || Staples Center  8,402 || 17-6
|- align="center" bgcolor="bbffb"
| 24 || Thu 23 || 10:30 || San Antonio || TWC101 || 101-77 || Toliver (29) || Parker (10) || ParkerToliver (6) || Staples Center  8,696 || 18-6
|- align="center" bgcolor="bbffb"
| 25 || Sat 25 || 10:30 || New York || NBATVTWC101 || 87-62 || Toliver (29) || Ogwumike (7) || Ogwumike (5) || Staples Center  12,433  || 19-6
|- align="center" bgcolor="ffbbbb"
| 26 || Thu 30 || 8:00 || @ Tulsa ||  || 85-99 || Toliver (21) || Milton-Jones (7) || Toliver (8) || BOK Center  5,275 || 19-7
|-

|- align="center" bgcolor="ffbbbb"
| 27 || Sun 2 || 6:00 || @ Chicago || KDOCCN100 || 74-85 || Toliver (19) || Parker (9) || Ogwumike (6) || Allstate Arena  6,197 || 19-8
|- align="center" bgcolor="ffbbbb"
| 28 || Tue 4 || 8:00 || @ Minnesota || NBATV || 77-88 || Beard (17) || Lavender (8) || Toliver (6) || Target Center  8,123 || 19-9
|- align="center" bgcolor="bbffb"
| 29 || Fri 7 || 7:00 || @ Washington || CSN-MA || 96-68 || ParkerToliver (18) || Parker (9) || Parker (8) || Verizon Center  7,468 || 20-9
|- align="center" bgcolor="ffbbbb"
| 30 || Sun 9 || 4:00 || @ New York || KDOCMSG || 71-73 || Toliver (17) || Parker (15) || Toliver (4) || Prudential Center  7,357 || 20-10
|- align="center" bgcolor="bbffb"
| 31 || Thu 13 || 10:30 || Chicago || NBATVTWC101CN100 || 86-77 || Ogwumike (30) || Ogwumike (11) || Parker (5) || Staples Center  8,489 || 21-10
|- align="center" bgcolor="bbffb"
| 32 || Fri 14 || 11:00 || Connecticut || NBATVTWC101CPTV-S || 93-82 || Parker (23) || Parker (10) || Toliver (6) || Staples Center  10,503 || 22-10
|- align="center" bgcolor="bbffb"
| 33 || Tue 18 || 10:30 || Phoenix || NBATVTWC101 || 101-76 || Parker (26) || Parker (11) || Parker (7) || Staples Center  8,579 || 23-10
|- align="center" bgcolor="bbffb"
| 34 || Thu 20 || 10:30 || Minnesota || NBATVTWC101 || 92-76 || OgwumikeParker (22) || OgwumikeParker (11) || Toliver (8)  || Staples Center  10,217 || 24-10
|-

| All games are viewable on WNBA LiveAccess or ESPN3.com

Postseason

|- align="center" bgcolor="bbffbb"
| 1 || September 27 || 10:00 || San Antonio || ESPN2 || 93-86 || Toliver (29) || Parker (9) || Beard (3) || Galen Center  5,013 || 1-0
|- align="center" bgcolor="bbffbb"
| 2 || September 29 || 3:00 || @ San Antonio || NBATV || 101-94 || Parker (32) || Parker (9) || Parker (6) || Freeman Coliseum  5,293 || 2-0
|-

|- align="center" bgcolor="ffbbbb"
| 1 || October 4 || 8:00 || @ Minnesota || ESPN2 || 77-94 || Parker (25) || Parker (11) || Parker (4) || Target Center  8,513 || 0-1
|- align="center" bgcolor="ffbbbb"
| 2 || October 7 || 3:30 || Minnesota || ABC || 79-80 || Parker (33) || Parker (15) || Beard (7) || Staples Center  10,791 || 0-2
|-

Statistics

Regular season

Awards and honors

References

External links

Los Angeles Sparks seasons
Los Angeles
Los Angeles Sparks